An international organization or international organisation (see spelling differences), also known as an intergovernmental organization or an international institution, is a stable set of norms and rules meant to govern the behavior of states and other actors in the international system. Organizations may be established by a treaty or be an instrument governed by international law and possessing its own legal personality, such as the United Nations, the World Health Organization and NATO. International organizations are composed of primarily member states, but may also include other entities, such as other international organizations, firms, and nongovernmental organizations. Additionally, entities (including states) may hold observer status.

Notable examples include the United Nations (UN), Organization for Security and Co-operation in Europe (OSCE), Bank for International Settlements (BIS), Council of Europe (COE), International Labour Organization (ILO) and International Criminal Police Organization (INTERPOL).

Terminology 
International organizations are sometimes referred to as intergovernmental organizations (IGOs), to clarify the distinction from international non-governmental organizations (INGOs), which are non-governmental organizations (NGOs) that operate internationally. These include international nonprofit organizations such as the World Organization of the Scout Movement, International Committee of the Red Cross and Médecins Sans Frontières, as well as lobby groups that represent the interests of multinational corporations.

IGOs are established by a treaty that acts as a charter creating the group. Treaties are formed when lawful representatives (governments) of several states go through a ratification process, providing the IGO with an international legal personality. Intergovernmental organizations are an important aspect of public international law.

In 1935, Pitman B. Potter defined international organization as "an association or union of nations established or recognized by them for the purpose of realizing a common end". He distinguished between bilateral and multilateral organizations on one end and customary or conventional organizations on the other end.

Intergovernmental organizations in a legal sense should be distinguished from simple groupings or coalitions of states, such as the G7 or the Quartet. Such groups or associations have not been founded by a constituent document and exist only as task groups. Intergovernmental organizations must also be distinguished from treaties. Many treaties (such as the North American Free Trade Agreement, or the General Agreement on Tariffs and Trade before the establishment of the World Trade Organization) do not establish an independent secretariat and instead rely on the parties for their administration, for example by setting up a joint committee. Other treaties have established an administrative apparatus which was not deemed to have been granted binding legal authority. The broader concept wherein relations among three or more states are organized according to certain principles they hold in common is multilateralism.

Types and purpose
Intergovernmental organizations differ in function, membership, and membership criteria. They have various goals and scopes, often outlined in the treaty or charter. Some IGOs developed to fulfill a need for a neutral forum for debate or negotiation to resolve disputes. Others developed to carry out mutual interests with unified aims to preserve peace through conflict resolution and better international relations, promote international cooperation on matters such as environmental protection, to promote human rights, to promote social development (education, health care), to render humanitarian aid, and to economic development. Some are more general in scope (the United Nations) while others may have subject-specific missions (such as INTERPOL or the International Telecommunication Union and other standards organizations). Common types include:
 Worldwide or global organizations — generally open to nations worldwide as long as certain criteria are met: This category includes the United Nations (UN) and its specialized agencies, the World Health Organization, the International Telecommunication Union (ITU), the World Bank, and the International Monetary Fund (IMF). It also includes globally operating intergovernmental organizations that are not an agency of the UN, including for example: the Hague Conference on Private International Law, a globally operating intergovernmental organization based in The Hague that pursues the progressive unification of private international law; the International Criminal Court that adjudicates crimes defined under the Rome Statute; and the CGIAR (formerly the Consultative Group for International Agricultural Research), a global partnership that unites intergovernmental organizations engaged in research for a food-secured future.
 Cultural, linguistic, ethnic, religious, or historical organizations — open to members based on some cultural, linguistic, ethnic, religious, or historical link: Examples include the Commonwealth of Nations, Arab League, Organisation internationale de la Francophonie, Community of Portuguese Language Countries, Organization of Turkic States, International Organization of Turkic Culture, Organisation of Islamic Cooperation, and Commonwealth of Independent States (CIS).
 Economic organizations — based on macro-economic policy goals: Some are dedicated to free trade and reduction of trade barriers, e.g. World Trade Organization, International Monetary Fund. Others are focused on international development. International cartels, such as OPEC, also exist. The Organisation for Economic Co-operation and Development (OECD) was founded as an economic-policy-focused organization. An example of a recently formed economic IGO is the Bank of the South.
 Educational organizations — centered around tertiary-level study. EUCLID University was chartered as a university and umbrella organization dedicated to sustainable development in signatory countries; United Nations University researches pressing global problems that are the concern of the United Nations, its Peoples and Member States.
 Health and Population Organizations — based on common perceived health and population goals. These are formed to address those challenges collectively, for example the intergovernmental partnership for population and development Partners in Population and Development.
 Regional organizations — open to members from a particular continent or other specific region of the world. This category includes the Community of Latin American and Caribbean States (CLACS), Council of Europe (CoE), European Union (EU), Eurasian Economic Union (EAEU), Energy Community, North Atlantic Treaty Organization (NATO), Economic Community of West African States (ECOWAS), Organization for Security and Co-operation in Europe, African Union (AU), Organization of American States (OAS), Association of Caribbean States (ACS), Association of Southeast Asian Nations (ASEAN), Islamic Development Bank, Union of South American Nations, Asia Cooperation Dialogue (ACD), Pacific Islands Forum, South Asian Association for Regional Cooperation Asian-African Legal Consultative Organization (AALCO) and the Organisation of Eastern Caribbean States (OECS).

Regional organizations
In regional organizations like the European Union, African Union, NATO, and ASEAN, there are restrictions on membership due to factors such as geography or political regimes. To enter the European Union (EU), the states require different criteria; member states need to be European, liberal-democratic political system, and be a capitalist economy.

The oldest regional organization is the Central Commission for Navigation on the Rhine, created in 1815 by the Congress of Vienna.

Participation and involvement
There are several different reasons a state may choose membership in an intergovernmental organization. But there are also reasons membership may be rejected.

Reasons for participation:
 Economic rewards: In the case of the North American Free Trade Agreement (NAFTA), membership in the free trade agreement benefits the parties’ economies. For example, Mexican companies are given better access to U.S. markets due to their membership.
 Political influence: Smaller countries, such as Portugal and Belgium, who do not carry much political clout on the international stage, are given a substantial increase in influence through membership in IGOs such as the European Union. Also for countries with more influence such as France and Germany, IGOs are beneficial as the nation increases influence in the smaller countries’ internal affairs and expanding other nations dependence on themselves, so to preserve allegiance.
 Security: Membership in an IGO such as NATO gives security benefits to member countries. This provides an arena where political differences can be resolved.
 Democracy: It has been noted that member countries experience a greater degree of democracy and those democracies survive longer.

Reasons for rejecting membership:
 Loss of sovereignty: Membership often comes with a loss of state sovereignty as treaties are signed that require co-operation on the part of all member states.
 Insufficient benefits: Often membership does not bring about substantial enough benefit to warrant membership in the organization.

Privileges and immunities

Intergovernmental organizations are provided with privileges and immunities that are intended to ensure their independent and effective functioning. They are specified in the treaties that give rise to the organization (such as the Convention on the Privileges and Immunities of the United Nations and the Agreement on the Privileges and Immunities of the International Criminal Court), which are normally supplemented by further multinational agreements and national regulations (for example the International Organizations Immunities Act in the United States). The organizations are thereby immune from the jurisdiction of national courts. Certain privileges and immunities are also specified in the Vienna Convention on the Representation of States in their Relations with International Organizations of a Universal Character of 1975,. which however has so far not been signed by 35 states and is thus not yet in force (status: 2022).

Rather than by national jurisdiction, legal accountability is intended to be ensured by legal mechanisms that are internal to the intergovernmental organization itself and access to administrative tribunals. In the course of many court cases where private parties tried to pursue claims against international organizations, there has been a gradual realization that alternative means of dispute settlement are required as states have fundamental human rights obligations to provide plaintiffs with access to court in view of their right to a fair trial. Otherwise, the organizations’ immunities may be put in question in national and international courts. Some organizations hold proceedings before tribunals relating to their organization to be confidential, and in some instances have threatened disciplinary action should an employee disclose any of the relevant information. Such confidentiality has been criticized as a lack of transparency.

The immunities also extend to employment law. In this regard, immunity from national jurisdiction necessitates that reasonable alternative means are available to effectively protect employees’ rights; in this context, a first instance Dutch court considered an estimated duration of proceedings before the Administrative Tribunal of the International Labour Organization of 15 years to be too long.

United Nations Agencies and Related organizations 
The United Nations focuses on five main areas: "maintaining peace and security, protecting human rights, delivering humanitarian aid, supporting sustainable development, and upholding international law". UN agencies, such as UN Relief and Works Agency, are generally regarded as international organizations in their own right. Additionally, the United Nations has Specialized Agencies, which are organizations within the United Nations System that have their member states (often nearly identical to the UN Member States) and are governed independently by them; examples include international organizations that predate the UN, such as the International Telecommunication Union, and the Universal Postal Union, as well as organizations that were created after the UN such as the World Health Organization (which was made up of regional organizations such as PAHO that predated the UN). A few UN special agencies are very centralized in policy and decision-making, but some are decentralized; for example, the country-based projects or missions’ directors and managers can decide what they want to do in the fields.

The UN agencies have a variety of tasks based on their specialization and their interests. The UN agencies provide different kinds of assistance to low-income countries and middle-income countries, and this assistance would be a good resource for developmental projects in developing countries. The UN has to protect any kind of human rights violation, and in the UN system, some specialized agencies, like ILO and United Nations High Commissioner for Refugees (UNHCR), work in the human rights' protection fields. The UN agency, ILO, is trying to end any kind of discrimination in the work field and child labor; after that, this agency promotes fundamental labor rights and to get safe and secure for the laborers.

History 
The origin of IGOs can be traced way back from the Congress of Vienna of 1814–1815, which was an international diplomatic conference to reconstitute the European political order after the downfall of the French Emperor Napoleon. States then became the main decision makers who preferred to maintain their sovereignty as of 1648 at the Westphalian treaty that closed the 30 years’ war in Europe.

The first and oldest international organization—being established employing a treaty, and creating a permanent secretariat, with a global membership—was the International Telecommunication Union (founded in 1865).  The first general international organization—addressing a variety of issues—was the League of Nations, founded on 10 January 1920 with a principal mission of maintaining world peace after World War I. The United Nations followed this model after World War II. This was signed on 26 June 1945, in San Francisco, at the conclusion of the United Nations Conference on International Organization, and came into force on 24 October 1945. Currently, the UN is the main IGO with its arms such as the United Nations Security Council (UNSC), the General Assembly (UNGA), the International Court of Justice (ICJ), the Secretariat (UNSA), the Trusteeship Council (UNTC) and the Economic and Social Council (ECOSOC). Other IGOs include Regional Councils like ICES and the Mediterranean Science Commission (CIESM),  and continental blocks like the European Union (EU), African Union (AU), East African Community (EAC), and Multi- National Companies (MNCs) like SHELL.

Expansion and growth
Held and McGrew counted thousands of IGOs worldwide in 2002 and this number continues to rise. This may be attributed to globalization, which increases and encourages the co-operation among and within states and which has also provided easier means for IGO growth as a result of increased international relations. This is seen economically, politically, militarily, as well as on the domestic level. Economically, IGOs gain material and non-material resources for economic prosperity. IGOs also provide more political stability within the state and among differing states. Military alliances are also formed by establishing common standards in order to ensure security of the members to ward off outside threats. Lastly, the formation has encouraged autocratic states to develop into democracies in order to form an effective and internal government.

According to a different estimate, the number of IGOs in the world has increased from less than 100 in 1949 to about 350 in 2000.

See also 

 Intergovernmentalism
 International financial institutions
 International organisations in Europe
 International relations
 International trade
 Index of international trade topics
 List of intergovernmental organizations
 List of organizations with .int domain names
 List of regional organizations by population
 List of supranational environmental agencies
 List of trade blocs
 Multilateralism
 Non-aggression pact
 Regional Economic Communities
 Regional integration
 Regional organization
 Supranational aspects of international organizations
 Supranational union
 Trade bloc
 World government

References

Further reading 
 Barnett, Michael and Finnemore, M. 2004. Rules for the World: International Organizations in Global Politics. Cornell University Press.
 Hurd, Ian. 2018. International Organizations: Politics, Law, Practice. Cambridge University Press.
 Lall, Ranjit. 2017. "Beyond Institutional Design: Explaining the Performance of International Organizations." International Organization 53: 699-732.
 
 IGO search Free service allowing search through websites of all intergovernmental organizations (IGOs) as recognized and profiled by the Union of International Associations.

External links 
 Headquarters of International Organisation List of International Organisation and their Headquarters
 Procedural history and related documents on the 'Articles on the Responsibility of International Organizations'' in the Historic Archives of the United Nations Audiovisual Library of International Law
 World News related documents on the World News related documents
 IGO Search: IGO/NGO google custom search engine built by the Govt Documents Round Table (GODORT) of the American Library Association.
 Intergovernmental organization at hls.harvard.edu

 
Cultural globalization